Schanzenkopf (Spessart) is a wooded hill of Bavaria, Germany. It lies in the Mittelgebirge Spessart in the district of Aschaffenburg.

Schanzenkopf has a maximum elevation of 343 metres. It is located in the municipal territory of Alzenau and is part of the ridge Hahnenkamm, the highest elevation of which lies just to the northeast of Schanzenkopf.

There is another hill named Schanzenkopf (also known as Schwedenschanze) not far to the northeast, on the other side of the Kahl.

The remains of a hill fort have been discovered on Schanzenkopf (Schanze is German for fieldwork or rampart). However, it is unclear whether this dates from prehistoric or medieval times.

References

External links

Mountains of Bavaria
Hill forts in Germany
Aschaffenburg (district)
Hills of the Spessart